"Dark Order" is the first EP by the Swedish death metal band Aeon. It was released in May 2001.

Track listing

Personnel 
Aeon
 Tommy Dahlström – vocals
 Zeb Nilsson – guitars
 Johan Hjelm – bass
 Arttu Malkki – drums

Production
 Johan Hjelm – production, engineering, mixing and mastering
 Recorded and mixed at Courthouse Studios in Östersund, Sweden; Summer 2000
 Jose Montemayor – cover artwork and layout

References 
 [ Dark Order] at Allmusic

2001 debut EPs
Aeon (band) albums